Mount Nilsen is a peak 4 nautical miles (7 km) west-southwest of Mount Paterson in the Rockefeller Mountains, on Edward VII Peninsula. Discovered in 1929 by the Byrd Antarctic Expedition, and named by Byrd for Captain Nilsen of the Norwegian whaler C.A. Larsen, which towed the City of New York through the pack ice.

Mountains of King Edward VII Land